†Partula formosa was a species of air-breathing tropical land snail, a terrestrial pulmonate gastropod mollusk in the family  Partulidae. This species was endemic to Ra'iātea, French Polynesia. It is now extinct.

References

F
Extinct gastropods
Extinct animals of Oceania
Fauna of French Polynesia
Molluscs of Oceania
Molluscs of the Pacific Ocean
Gastropods described in 1884
Taxa named by William Harper Pease
Taxonomy articles created by Polbot